Boquerón District is a district (distrito) of Chiriquí Province in Panama. The population according to the 2000 census was 12,275. The district covers a total area of 282 km². The capital lies at the city of Boquerón.

Administrative divisions
Boquerón District is divided administratively into the following corregimientos:

Boquerón (capital)
Bágala
Cordillera
Guabal
Guayabal
Paraíso
Pedregal
Tijeras

References

Districts of Panama
Chiriquí Province